Nebraska Crossing (NEX Crossing) is an outdoor lifestyle center in Gretna, Nebraska with over 85 global and national retail brands. It was completely redeveloped and opened on November 15, 2013.

Its anchor stores are Tory Burch, Kate Spade New York, Polo Ralph Lauren, Nike, Under Armour, Coach, Michael Kors, UNTUCKit, Tecovas, and Vineyard Vines.

History
The original Nebraska Crossing Outlets building was a  Strip mall built in 1991 and opened in 1992. The building was demolished in March 2013 to make way for a redeveloped mall.

The new  Nebraska Crossing opened on November 15, 2013. The design by Avant Architects features a much more intimate, walking-oriented experience than the old strip mall, featuring a courtyard. The  mall cost $112 million to build.

In August 2014 it was announced two additions would be built at NEX, adding a total of 26,000 square feet to the mall.

NEX also boasts the largest Under Armour store in the United States.

In its first year of operation, the new NEX saw an estimated 4 million visitors and $140 million in sales. In the seventh year of operation, Nebraska Crossing has surpassed $1 Billion in sales with five expansions completed, including the largest H&M in the state of Nebraska, Ulta Beauty, and a 38,000 sq. ft TJ Maxx & HomeGoods combo store.

In Fall of 2022, popular retailer REI Co-op will open its first Nebraska store, a 22,000 square foot store at Nebraska Crossing featuring a full-service bike shop, gear rentals and more.

References

 Outlet malls in the United States
Shopping malls in Nebraska
Shopping malls established in 1991
1991 establishments in Nebraska